Bentley House, also known as the Museum of the Ozarks, is a historic home located at Springfield, Greene County, Missouri. It was built in 1892, and is a two-story, Queen Anne style brick and frame dwelling. It has a complex roof of gables and hips projecting at right angles and accented by several dormers. It features a semi-detached tower with conical roof, projecting bays on primary and secondary facades, multiple porches, and a porte cochere.  It was a single family home until 1964, dormitory for Drury College from 1965 to 1977, then home to the Museum of the Ozarks.

It was listed on the National Register of Historic Places in 1980.

References

Houses on the National Register of Historic Places in Missouri
Queen Anne architecture in Missouri
Houses completed in 1892
Buildings and structures in Springfield, Missouri
National Register of Historic Places in Greene County, Missouri